Louise Marie d'Orléans (5 August 1726 – 14 May 1728) was a French princess of the blood by birth. She died in infancy.

Biography
Louise Marie d'Orléans was born at the Palais-Royal to Louis d'Orléans, Duke of Orléans and his Duchess, the Margravine Johanna of Baden-Baden, who died three days after giving birth.

Her father was a second cousin of the then King Louis XV, and a great-grandson of Louis XIII. Her mother was the last child of the famous general Louis William, Margrave of Baden-Baden. Louise Marie was initially known at court as Mademoiselle d'Orléans and, after the death of her father's first cousin Louise Anne de Bourbon, as Mademoiselle.

She died at the age of 1 year and 8 months at the Château de Saint-Cloud near Paris, and was buried in the Val-de-Grâce Convent in Paris.

Ancestors

Notes

1726 births
1728 deaths
Nobility from Paris
House of Orléans
Princesses of the Blood
18th-century French people
Princesses of France (Bourbon)
Burials at Val-de-Grâce (church)
Royalty and nobility who died as children